Schulich may refer to:

People with the surname
Seymour Schulich, Canadian businessman and philanthropist

Institutions
Schulich School of Business, York University
Schulich School of Engineering, University of Calgary
Schulich School of Law, Dalhousie University
Schulich School of Medicine & Dentistry, University of Western Ontario
Schulich School of Music, McGill University
Schulich School of Education, Nipissing University